Roots of Earth Are Consuming My Home is the first full-length album by the American band Full of Hell. It was released in 2011 on A389 Records.

Track listing

References

2011 albums
Full of Hell (band) albums